Brian McFayden (born October 1, 1976) is an American television personality.  He has worked as an MTV News anchor and an MTV VJ.  He worked at KGW, the NBC affiliate station in Portland, Oregon, from December 2016 to October 2017.

Biography 

McFayden was born in Omaha, Nebraska. He first became known as an MTV News anchor, before transitioning into a MTV VJ, and occasional host for TRL and other shows.  McFayden hosted Cupid on CBS and the host of the first season of The CW's Beauty and the Geek (when it was on The WB).  He also worked with popular radio disc jockey, Cane for several years on KEGE 93.7 The Edge in Minneapolis and for 92.3 K-Rock Radio in New York City.

McFayden hosted and produced for Al Gore's Current TV. 
In May 2011, McFayden began hosting 7 Wonders of the Wall on MSN.

In August 2012, McFayden was signed by Silver Chalice Ventures, based out of Chicago, Illinois, to host "Campus Insiders", an online, digital NCAA college football and basketball show.

As of March 2014, he was a reporter/anchor for HLN Morning Express Bleacher Report.

In December 2016, he began working as a morning news anchor and co-host of Portland Today for KGW in Portland, Oregon.

In January 2017, McFayden was removed from the morning programs and placed on KGW's Live At 7 evening news program as the host.
In October 2017, he left KGW, or at least its news division, for unknown reasons.

In December 2020, McFayden began working at KYGO FM 98.5 in Denver, CO.
In March 2021 he left the station

Filmography

Film
Die Trying (2010) – Himself

Television
 KGW Live At 7 (January 2017 – October 2017) – Host
 KGW Sunrise (December 2016 – January 2017) – Morning Anchor
 Portland Today (December 2016 – January 2017) – Co-host
Headline News Bleacher Report (2014–2015) – Sports Reporter/Anchor
7 Wonders of the Wall (2011–present) – Host MSN
KTLA Morning Show (2010) – Anchor CW
It's a Knockout! (2009 pilot) – Host NBC
Fake or Real (2009–present) – Host E!
Current TV  (2007–2009) – Host/Producer Current TV
Campus Ladies (2006) – Oxygen
Beauty and the Geek (2005) – Host WB
Grounded for Life (2005) – Greg WB
The WB's Superstar USA (2004) – Host WB
Cupid (2003) – Host CBS
The Real World: Chicago – Stop Being Polite: Reunion (2002) – Host MTV
Dawson's Creek (2002) – Male VJ WB
TRL Presents: VJ for a Day (2001) – Host
MADtv (2001) – Himself FOX
Miss Teen USA (2000–2001) – Host CBS
Sabrina, the Teenage Witch (2001) – Destiny
Total Request Live (2000–2003) – VJ MTV

References

External links

1976 births
American radio personalities
VJs (media personalities)
American television reporters and correspondents
Living people
Television anchors from Portland, Oregon